= The Eye of Night =

2002 fantasy novel by Pauline Alama

- Author: Pauline Alama
- Language: English
- Genre: Fantasy
- Publication date: 2002
- Publication place: United States

The Eye of Night is a 2002 fantasy novel by Pauline Alama.

It is notable for including among its leading characters a dwarf called Hwyn—not the mythological race of Dwarves but the human variation of dwarfism. Hwyn is the romantic and heroic figure around whom the story turns.

== Plot summary ==
The narrative concerns the adventures of Jereth, a self-doubting priest, and Hwyn, the young woman who protects the Eye of Night, a jewel that is connected with what appears to be an impending apocalypse. The story is woven with themes of Daoist balance and Christian Resurrection.
